Ashton Bell is a Canadian ice hockey player, currently playing for the Minnesota Duluth Bulldogs of the NCAA Division I.

Career 
During high school, she played for the Western Wildcats of the Manitoba AAA Female Midget Hockey League, twice winning the league's Most Valuable Player Award.

In 2017, she began attending the University of Minnesota-Duluth, playing for the university's women's ice hockey programme. She had originally committed to the University of North Dakota but was forced to change plans after UND eliminated its women's hockey programme. She scored 23 points in 35 games in her rookie NCAA year, good for second on her team in scoring. She was moved from forward to defence ahead of the 2019–20 season. She posted a career-high 32 points in 36 games that year, leading all Western Collegiate Hockey Association defenders in scoring and being named to the All-WCHA First Team. She was then named team captain for the 2020–21 season. She was named Western Collegiate Hockey Association Player of the Month in November 2020.

International career 
Bell represented Canada at the 2016 and 2017 IIHF World Women's U18 Championship, scoring a total of eight points in ten games and winning silver twice. In 2017, she served as the Canadian team captain. She was one of 28 players invited to Hockey Canada's Centralization Camp, which represents the seletion process for the Canadian women's team that shall compete in Ice hockey at the 2022 Winter Olympics.

On January 11, 2022, Bell was named to Canada's 2022 Olympic team.

Personal life 
Bell studies biology at the University of Minnesota-Duluth. She previously graduated from Deloraine High School in Manitoba, competing in the Manitoba High School Rodeo Association alongside her hockey play.

References

External links

1999 births
Living people
Canadian women's ice hockey forwards
Minnesota Duluth Bulldogs women's ice hockey players
Canadian expatriate ice hockey players in the United States
Ice hockey players at the 2022 Winter Olympics
Olympic ice hockey players of Canada
Medalists at the 2022 Winter Olympics
Olympic gold medalists for Canada
Olympic medalists in ice hockey